The 2012 The All-Japan Rugby Football Championship (日本ラグビーフットボール選手権大会 Nihon Ragubi-Futtobo-ru Senshuken Taikai) took place from Feb 25th up to the final on March 18.

Qualifying

Top League
The top four teams (Suntory Sungoliath, Sanyo Wild Knights, Toshiba Brave Lupus, NEC Green Rockets) in the 2011–12 Top League automatically qualified for the competition, and competed in a playoff competition.

Sanyo Wild Knights and Suntory Sungoliath eventually played in the Final, with Suntory Sungoliath winning 47–28. As Top League finalists they gained automatic entry to the Championship Semi-finals.

The Top League Wildcard Tournament was contested by the fifth to tenth teams in the final table for the last two places for this league in the Championship. This was competed by (Kintetsu Liners, Kobelco Steelers, Ricoh Black Rams, Yamaha Júbilo, NTT Communications Shining Arcs, Toyota Verblitz) and eventually taken by Kobe Steelers and Yamaha Júbilo.

Top Challenge One 
In the 2011–12 Challenge series, the teams from Top Challenge One (Canon Eagles, Toyota Industries Shuttles, Kyushu Denryoku Voltex) and Kubota Spears (Top Challenge Two Winner) competed over 3 rounds to gain the first place (as Top Challenger One) for qualification to the Championship. This was eventually won by Canon Eagles.

University 
In the 48th Japan National University Rugby Championship final Teikyo University defeated Tenri University 15–12. Both teams gained entry to the Championship as finalists.

Club 
In the 19th All Japan Rugby Club Championship, Rokko Fighting Bull beat Tamariba Club to gain the Top Club side entry to the Championship.

Qualifying Teams 

 Top League Playoff Finalists - Suntory Sungoliath, Sanyo Wild Knights
 Top League Playoff Semi-Finalists - Toshiba Brave Lupus, NEC Green Rockets
 Top League Wild Card Playoff -  Kobelco Steelers, Yamaha Júbilo
 All Japan University Rugby Championship - Teikyo University, Tenri University
 All Japan Rugby Club Championship - Rokko Fighting Bull
 Top Challenger One Series - Canon Eagles

Knockout stages

First round

Quarter-final

Semi-final 

Suntory Sungoliath and Sanyo Wild Knights bypassed the first two rounds into the semi-finals by reaching the final of the Top League playoffs in 2012.

Final

See also 
 Rugby Union in Japan

External links 
 Official JRFU Scores and Details (Japanese)
 [Official JRFU Final Details]

All-Japan Rugby Football Championship
2011–12 in Japanese rugby union